Hurt So Bad is a 1969 studio album by Nancy Wilson, featuring arrangements by Jimmy Jones, Billy May, Oliver Nelson, and others. The album entered the Billboard Top 200 Chart on November 8, 1969, and remained for 18 weeks, peaking at #92 in January 1970.

Jason Ankeny at AllMusic says Hurt So Bad has "a soulful, vibrant sound inspired by mainstream pop and R&B," and that the material ranges from "a subtly funky rendition of 'Willie and Laura Mae Jones' to a poignant 'You're All I Need to Get By' to a dynamic 'Spinning Wheel.'" He notes the "hodgepodge of arrangers" but says the album "is a surprisingly cohesive listen."

Track listing

Side 1 

 "Willie and Laura Mae Jones" (Tony Joe White) – 2:47 	
 "Let's Make the Most of a Beautiful Thing" (Jacques Wilson, Mike Corda) – 2:40
 "You're All I Need to Get By" (Nickolas Ashford, Valerie Simpson) – 2:20
 "Can't Take My Eyes Off You" (Bob Crewe, Bob Gaudio) – 3:21
 "Hurt So Bad" (Teddy Randazzo, Bobby Weinstein, Bobby Hart) – 3:00

Side 2 

 "Spinning Wheel" (David Clayton-Thomas) – 2:38
 "Do You Know Why" (Jimmy Van Heusen, Johnny Burke) – 2:39
 "Come Back to Me" (Burton Lane, Alan Jay Lerner) – 2:35
 "Ages Ago" (Paul Francis Webster, Ronnell Bright) – 2:23
 "One Soft Night" (Anthony Curtis, Lonnie Tolbert) – 2:36

Personnel 

 Nancy Wilson – vocals
 Jimmy Jones – piano, arranger ("Can't Take My Eyes Off You," "Spinning Wheel," "Come Back to Me," "One Soft Night")
 Phil Wright – arranger ("Willie and Laura Mae Jones," "You're All I Need to Get By," "Hurt So Bad")
 Oliver Nelson – arranger ("Let's Make the Most of a Beautiful Thing")
 Billy May – arranger ("Do You Know Why")
 Sid Feller – arranger ("Ages Ago")
 David Cavanaugh – producer

References 

1969 albums
Nancy Wilson (jazz singer) albums
Albums produced by Dave Cavanaugh
Albums arranged by Oliver Nelson
Albums arranged by Billy May
Albums arranged by Sid Feller
Albums arranged by Jimmy Jones (pianist)
Capitol Records albums